River is a village and civil parish in Kent, England, situated between the historic town of Dover and the neighbouring village of Temple Ewell. The 2011 census recorded a population of 3,876 in the village. River is 1 mile south west of the A2 and 2 miles north of the A20, and a railway station at Kearsney provides direct access to London.

History
There are two churches in the village, the 11th-century Anglican parish church of St Peter & St Paul, and a Methodist church with a history dating back to 1834.

The oldest residential sections of River date from the 1800s or earlier. Later development possibly dates to the 1930s, as well as recent developments from the 1960s and 1970s.

Geography
River is situated in a steep wooded valley formed by the River Dour. At its north-west end the valley splits into the Dour Valley, in which Temple Ewell lies, and the Alkham Valley, which for much of the time is dry but which contains the Drellingore, a highly seasonal stream characteristic of chalk downland (another example being the nearby Nailbourne). The confluence of the Dour and Drellingore rivers is situated in Kearsney Abbey.

Along the axis of the Dour, the land slopes gradually down towards the sea about  distant. The common land areas above Kearsney Abbey provide a view of Dover and its castle, and much of the area consists of delicate chalk grassland.

Governance
River comes under the jurisdiction of Dover District Council and is in the Dover and Deal parliamentary constituency. River has had its own Parish Council since 1987. An electoral ward in the same name exists. This ward includes Hougham Without and has a total population at the 2011 census of 4,564.

Economy
River once had a number of shops, but most have gradually closed; a small Co-op supermarket, as well as two other grocery stores exist in the town today. River retains its post office, as well as a pharmacy and a Chinese take-away.

The village has a park, Kearsney Abbey, and two other parks nearby.

Recreation and culture

There are two significant green areas, the River Recreation Ground (which is home to the River Bowling Club) and Kearsney Abbey. Despite its name, Kearsney Abbey was never a monastic estate but was the name given to a manor house, built by the Fector family in the early 19th century. The house fell into disrepair after World War II and was demolished around 1960. All that remains of the building today is the billiard room.

The nearby stadium of Crabble Athletic Ground is home to Dover Athletic F.C., and is situated at the Dover end of Lewisham Road. Crabble once had a cricket ground, the home of the now defunct Dover Cricket Club, which used to host First Class cricket.

The park of Russell Gardens is situated on the Alkham Valley Road beyond Kearsney Abbey.

In 2021 a number of painted paving slabs were erected in the old bus terminus which were created by local resident Vicky Thomas during the 2020 COVID lockdown.

The village has a primary school of about 400 pupils.

Mills
River owes its early existence to milling. The River Dour, which runs through the village and along which Lower Road is built, once supported several water-powered flour and paper mills. One of them, formerly known as Mannering's Mill but now known as Crabble Corn Mill (built in 1812), survives in working form. It now promotes itself as a visitor attraction and restaurant.

The site of the other major mill in River is disused, situated at the downstream end of Kearsney Abbey. It forms a habitat for water birds such as grey wagtails and kingfishers. Other mills existed further downstream, but all have been either demolished or converted for other industry or housing.

References

External links

Villages in Kent
Civil parishes in Kent